Muqan Qaghan (Old Turkic: 𐰢𐰆𐰴𐰣𐰴𐰍𐰣 Muqan qaγan, Chinese:木桿可汗/木杆可汗, Pinyin: mùgǎn kěhàn, Wade-Giles: mu-kan k'o-han or 木汗可汗, mùhàn kěhàn, mu-han k'o-han, personal name: 阿史那燕都, āshǐnà yàndōu, a-shih-na yen-to, Sogdian: mwx’n x’γ’n, Ruanruan: Muɣan Qaɣan) was the second son of Bumin Qaghan and the third khagan of the Göktürks who expanded their khaganate and secured the borders against the Hephthalites.

Reign 
His accession to power was followed by finishing off remnants of Rouran. Around the new year 554, after defeat of Yujiulü Kangdi at the hands of Göktürks, the remnants of Rouran, which by that point was near its end, surrendered to Northern Qi to seek protection from Gökturks attacks. Emperor Wenxuan personally attacked Muqan Qaghan, fighting his army off and then created Yujiulü Anluochen as the new khagan of Rouran, settling the Rouran people within Northern Qi territory, at Mayi (馬邑, in modern Shuozhou, Shanxi). 

Eventually last khagan of Rouran Yujiulü Dengshuzi was executed by Emperor Gong because of Gökturks' pressure.

In fall 563, Northern Zhou entered into an alliance treaty with Göktürks against Northern Qi, part of which involved a promise that Emperor Wu would marry the daughter of Muqan Qaghan. In winter 563, the joint forces of Northern Zhou and Gökturks launched a two-prong attack on Northern Qi, with the northern prong attacking Northern Qi's secondary capital Jinyang (晉陽, in modern Taiyuan, Shanxi) and the southern prong attacking Pingyang (平陽, in modern Linfen, Shanxi).

In spring 565, Emperor Wu sent his brother Yuwen Chun (宇文純), Yuwen Gui (宇文貴), Dou Yi (竇毅) and Yang Jian (楊薦) to lead a ceremonial guard corps to Tujue to welcome back Muqan's daughter for marriage to him.  However, when they arrived at Qaghan's headquarters, he turned against the treaty and detained Yuwen Chun and his attendants.

In spring 568, a major storm at Göktürks' headquarters inflicted substantial damage, and Muqan Qaghan took it as a sign of divine displeasure at his rescission of the marriage agreement with Northern Zhou. He therefore returned Yuwen Chun, along with the daughter he promised Emperor Wu, back to Northern Zhou. Emperor Wu personally welcomed her and created her empress.

Campaigns in West 
His uncle Istemi autonomously ruled the far-west region in his name. Göktürk army destroyed Hephtalite power in 557 near Bukhara. The northern part of the Oxus river was annexed to the Göktürks and southern part to Sassanid Persia.

Legacy 

This expansion also pushed against the Avars who were driven toward the Byzantine Empire and the Sassanid Empire and eventually toward the Danube. Other tribes of the Central Asia, such as the eastern Bulgars were also displaced.

Muqan's reign marked the pinnacle of Sogdian cultural influence in the Göktürk Empire. Sogdian culture was transmitted by merchants from Turpan who worked as ambassadors and advisers. The Sogdian language and script were used to govern the empire. The importance of Sogdians cannot be understated in keeping the early Turks safely outside of the Chinese cultural sphere. The Sogdian language and script were used to administer the empire, because it was the only written language in the cities under his control.

Muqan Qaghan was friendly to Buddhist people, and is credited with being the first to introduce Buddhism to the Türks. He promoted the construction of a Türkic Buddhist temple in the Chinese capital city of Chang'an. Despite his promotion of Buddhism in China, it is not known if he himself converted to Buddhism, and it is also uncertain whether or not a substantial number of Türks were Buddhists during his reign.

He expanded the Göktürk Qaghanate and secured the borders against the last of the Rouran people. He conquered the Töles tribes in the west, the Kitans in the east and the Kyrgyz in the north. Thus, he expanded his state to all the former Xiongnu territory.

After Muqan's death in 572 the title of Qaghan passed to his younger brother Taspar.

Physical appearance 
According to Chinese sources, Muqan Qaghan's appearance was strange: Muqan Qaghan, the third Qaghan of the First Turkic Khaganate, was described by Chinese authors as having an unusual appearance. He had eyes like "colored glazes" or "lapis lazuli" (meaning blue eyes) and a red complexion. His face was wide. He was characterized as being "tough and fierce", and he was regarded as brave and knowledgeable by the historians.

Family 
Muhan Qaghan's Türkic wife was childless. This caused difficulties for his son Talopien, as he was born to a non-Turkic woman who Muhan married as part of diplomatic relations with other states.

His daughter Empress Ashina was the wife of Emperor Wu of Northern Zhou. His son Apa Qaghan claimed the throne after death of his uncle Taspar unsuccessfully while his other son Yangsu Tegin was ancestor of later Western Turkic Qaghans.

References

Sources

Göktürk khagans
6th-century Turkic people
572 deaths
Ashina house of the Turkic Empire
Year of birth unknown
Rouran